Boladı is a village and municipality in the Lankaran Rayon of Azerbaijan.  It has a population of 7,940.

References

Populated places in Lankaran District